Poestenkill or Poesten Kill may refer to:

Poesten Kill, a creek in Rensselaer County, New York and the namesake of the town and CDP
Poestenkill, New York, a town in Rensselaer County
Poestenkill (CDP), New York, a census-designated place in the above town